The following is a list of armed conflicts with victims in 2019.

List guidelines
Listed are the armed conflicts having done globally at least 100 victims and at least 1 victim during the year 2019.

10,000+ deaths in 2019
Conflicts in the following list have caused at least 10,000 direct violent deaths in 2019.

1,000–9,999 deaths in 2019
Conflicts in the following list have caused at least 1,000 and fewer than 10,000 direct violent deaths in 2019.Conflicts causing at least 1,000 deaths in one calendar year are considered wars by the Uppsala Conflict Data Program.

100–999 deaths in 2019
Conflicts in the following list have caused at least 100 and fewer than 1,000 direct violent deaths in 2019.

Fewer than 100 deaths in 2019
Conflicts in the following list have caused at least 1 and fewer than 100 direct violent deaths in 2019.

See also

References
Notes

Citations

2019
2019